In geometry, a prismatoid is a polyhedron whose vertices all lie in two parallel planes. Its lateral faces can be trapezoids or triangles. If both planes have the same number of vertices, and the lateral faces are either parallelograms or trapezoids, it is called a prismoid.

Volume

Prismatoid families

Families of prismatoids include:

Pyramids, in which one plane contains only a single point;
Wedges, in which one plane contains only two points;
Prisms, whose polygons in each plane are congruent and joined by rectangles or parallelograms;
Antiprisms, whose polygons in each plane are congruent and joined by an alternating strip of triangles;
Star antiprisms;
Cupolae, in which the polygon in one plane contains twice as many points as the other and is joined to it by alternating triangles and rectangles;
Frusta obtained by truncation of a pyramid;
Quadrilateral-faced hexahedral prismatoids:
 Parallelepipeds – six parallelogram faces
 Rhombohedrons – six rhombus faces
 Trigonal trapezohedra – six congruent rhombus faces
 Cuboids – six rectangular faces
 Quadrilateral frusta – an apex-truncated square pyramid
 Cube – six square faces

Higher dimensions

In general, a polytope is prismatoidal if its vertices exist in two hyperplanes. For example, in four dimensions, two polyhedra can be placed in two parallel 3-spaces, and connected with polyhedral sides.

References

External links